The Arcul de Triumf (Romanian; "Triumphal Arch") is a triumphal arch located on the Kiseleff Road, in the northern part of Bucharest, Romania. The monument, designed by Petre Antonescu, was built in 1921–22, renovated in 1935–36, and renovated again starting in 2014. It commemorates Romania's victory in the First World War and the coronation of HM King Ferdinand and his wife Marie.

History
The first, wooden, triumphal arch was built hurriedly, after Romania gained its independence (1878), so that the victorious troops could march under it. Another arch with concrete skeleton and plaster exterior of elaborate sculptures and decoration designed by the architect Petre Antonescu was built on the same site after World War I in 1922. The arch exterior, which had seriously decayed, was replaced in 1935 by the current much more sober neoclassical design, more closely modelled on the Arc de Triomphe in Paris. The new arch, also designed by Antonescu and executed in stone, was inaugurated on 1 December 1936.

Nowadays, the Arcul de Triumf is one of the well-known symbols of the Romanian capital. Military parades are held beneath the arch each 1 December, with the occasion of Romanian National Day.

Description and surroundings
It has as its foundation a  rectangle. The sculptures with which the facades are decorated were created by famous Romanian sculptors such as Ion Jalea and Dimitrie Paciurea.

Elisabeta Palace, the current residence of the Romanian Royal Family, is located near the Arcul de Triumf, in Herăstrău Park.

See also
Arc de Triomphe

References

Terminating vistas
Triumphal arches in Romania
Monuments and memorials in Bucharest
World War I memorials in Romania
Historic monuments in Bucharest
Buildings and structures completed in 1936
1936 sculptures
Greater Romania